Office Killer is a 1997 American comedy-horror film directed by Cindy Sherman. It was released in 1997 and stars Carol Kane, Molly Ringwald and David Thornton.

Plot 
A magazine editor named Dorine, due to budget cuts, is forced to work from home. One night she is called to help fix the computer of a co-worker, Gary Michaels, who is electrocuted while trying to fix the wires. Dorine dials 911, but hangs up when the call is answered. She places the corpse on a cart, rolls it down to her car, loads it in her trunk, and takes it home, placing it in her basement. Then, seemingly without reason, she goes into a murder spree. She begins her spree by murdering another office worker, but later murders two young Girl Scouts who arrive at her door to sell cookies. The young girls join the other corpses in the basement, and Dorine is seen eating the cookies while working on her new laptop. Dorine sends messages from Gary to the remaining office workers, implying he is alive. There are three more murders before the movie ends, all artistically executed. The last murder is the office manager (played by a young Jeanne Tripplehorn), who awakens in the basement, surrounded by dismembered bodies, after being knocked out by Dorine on a lunch date. After dispatching the office manager's boyfriend, who had come searching for her (a young Michael Imperioli) with a kitchen knife, Dorine murders the office manager after taunting her for making her and other employees work from home. The last scene shows Dorine, after her mother's death, setting fire to her basement, then, sporting a blond wig and makeup and with the office manager's head in a bag on the seat beside her, driving away in her car, and circling a newspaper ad with her pencil for an office job.

Cast
 Carol Kane as Dorine Douglas
 Molly Ringwald as Kim Poole
 Jeanne Tripplehorn as Norah Reed
 Barbara Sukowa as Virginia Wingate
 Michael Imperioli as Daniel Birch
 David Thornton as Gary Michaels
 Alice Drummond as Carlotta Douglas
 Michelle Hurst as Kate
 Julia McIlvaine as Linda
 Timothy Stickney as Paramedic
 Eric Bogosian as Peter Douglas (uncredited)

Reception
Although poorly reviewed, The New York Times claimed the film included "a nasty caricature of Arianna Stassinopoulos Huffington". On review aggregator website Rotten Tomatoes, the film holds a 17% rating, based on 18 reviews, with an average rating of 3.1/10.

References

External links
 
 
 
 
 Office Killer at the TCM Movie Database

1997 films
1997 horror films
American comedy horror films
Workplace comedies
Films produced by Christine Vachon
1990s comedy horror films
1997 comedy films
1990s English-language films
1990s American films